Dazu District is a district of Chongqing, China, bordering Sichuan province to the northwest. It is where the famous Dazu Rock Carvings, a UNESCO World Heritage Site, is located. Dazu Lotus Manor is a tourist attraction with many lotus plants, some bred from seeds sent to space.

History
In the late 19th century, Dazu was the site of major violence led by the Gelaohui against Chinese Christians who were accused of controlling the local coal market, and resented for the large church built between two major temples devoted to Lingguan on the main market square. This church was destroyed multiple times in the 1880s and 1890s. The violence displaced thousands of people, with one incident, in 1890 leading to the deaths of 12 Christians who refused to bow to statues of Lingguan.

In October 2011, Dazu County and Shuangqiao District were merged to form the new Dazu District.

Transport
Dazushike railway station on Chengdu-Chongqing Central line high-speed railway is currently under construction

Administrative divisions

Climate

References

External links

Dazu District official government website

Districts of Chongqing